La Haute-Côte-Nord is a regional county municipality in northeastern Quebec, Canada, in the Côte-Nord region. It is located on the Gulf of Saint Lawrence where the Saguenay River flows into it. The seat is Les Escoumins. Its largest community is the city of Forestville.

Except for Sacré-Coeur, which is located along the Saguenay River, all places and municipalities of the RCM are along Quebec Route 138 directly on the shores of the Saint Lawrence River. The unorganized territory of Lac-au-Brochet makes up some 83% of the interior part of the RCM.

Subdivisions
There are 9 subdivisions and one native reserve within the RCM:

Cities & Towns (1)
 Forestville

Municipalities (6)
 Colombier
 Les Bergeronnes
 Les Escoumins
 Longue-Rive
 Portneuf-sur-Mer (formerly Sainte-Anne-de-Portneuf)
 Sacré-Coeur

Villages (1)
 Tadoussac

Unorganized Territory (1)
 Lac-au-Brochet

Native Reserves (1)
 Essipit

Transportation

Access Routes
Highways and numbered routes that run through the municipality, including external routes that start or finish at the county border:

 Autoroutes
 None

 Principal Highways
 
 

 Secondary Highways
 None

 External Routes
 None

See also
 List of regional county municipalities and equivalent territories in Quebec

References

 La Haute-Côte-Nord Regional County Municipality Statistics Canada